Lepidolide is a chemical compound with formula  — specifically, a terpenoid with the cucurbitane skeleton — isolated from the fruiting bodies of the mushroom Russula lepida (23 mg/7 kg).  It is a pale yellow oil, soluble in chloroform.

References 

Triterpenes
Dicarboxylic acids
Lactones